Wilson Fernando Kuhn Minuci, commonly known as Fernando Minuci (alternate spelling: Minucci; born 14 February 1969), is a Brazilian former professional basketball player.

National team career
With the senior Brazilian national basketball team, Minuci competed at the 1990 FIBA World Cup, the 1992 Summer Olympics, the 1994 FIBA World Cup, and the 1996 Summer Olympics.

References

External links
 

1969 births
Living people
Basketball players at the 1992 Summer Olympics
Basketball players at the 1996 Summer Olympics
Brazilian men's basketball players
1990 FIBA World Championship players
Franca Basquetebol Clube players
Sport Club Corinthians Paulista basketball players
Olympic basketball players of Brazil
Small forwards
Basketball players from São Paulo
1994 FIBA World Championship players